Hilda Emma Schneider (April 29, 1907 – March 15, 1980), who went by the stage name Daisy Earles, was a German-born actress with dwarfism who migrated to the United States in the early 1920s. She worked in Hollywood films and later toured with circus companies. Daisy Earles was blonde, pretty, and tall compared to her other sisters, and had a very well proportioned figure, for which she earned the epithet of a "miniature Mae West". Her circus acts with her siblings were primarily as "parade performers".

Biography

Earles was born Hilda Emma Schneider on April 29, 1907, in Stolpen, Germany to Emma and Gustav Schneider. Their three daughters, less than average height, migrated to the United States. They were encouraged by their father to work in the entertainment field taking advantage of their "hypopituitary" midget status.  

Her brother Kurt and sister Frieda were the first to migrate to California in 1916 after they had met Bert W. Earles and his wife, who became their agents. The Earles had toured with the Dancing Dolls family prior to their joining films and acting with new names. Kurt and Frieda changed their names to Harry and Grace to act in films and they adopted the surname "Earles" of their manager.

Their first dance appearance was for the Buffalo Bill Show in the roles as "Hansel and Gretel" for which they were hailed as the "Smallest Dancing Couple in the World". Hilda, who later came to be known as Daisy Earles, joined her brother and sister in California in the early 1920s. Another sister, Elly, joined them in 1926; she was called "Tiny", because of her appearance. All four siblings, who had earlier taken the surname Earles, changed it to "Doll" after the death of their manager, Earles.

Daisy Earles was most well known for her part in Freaks in 1932. However, the film was considered horrifying and was shown in the U.S. with many cuts, banned in England, and in Canada was called "brutal and grotesque".

In 1928, Earles had appeared in the 1928 film Three-Ring Marriage. She and her siblings Tiny, Grace, and Harry, performed as "Munchkins" in a song and dance sequence along the Yellow Brick Road, in The Wizard of Oz (1939). They were not credited individually in the film, but as "The Singer Midgets", despite having been generally well known as "The Doll Family". She had a small uncredited role in 1952's The Greatest Show on Earth, for which she won an award for her "blink-and-you-miss-it" photo shot.

Daisy retired from film acting in 1952, after her bit part in The Greatest Show on Earth. She and her siblings continued working for the Ringling Brothers Circus and Barnum and Bailey Circus where they appeared as "parade performers" in "side shows for 30 seasons". They all retired in 1958.

Following retirement, Daisy lived in Sarasota, Florida with her three siblings. Subsequent to Daisy's death in March 1980 at the age of 72, three documentaries dedicated to her and her siblings were released. These are: Freaks Uncensored! (1999), Ce nain que je ne saurais voir! (2015, a TV film), and Schlitzie: One of Us (2015). In one , it is stated that Franz Taibosh, an Afrikaner, had a "crush" on her, but she was not interested as she was already married to her husband, who also worked as a chauffeur and security person for her family.

References

Bibliography

1907 births
1980 deaths
People from Stolpen
People from the Kingdom of Saxony
German emigrants to the United States
Actresses from Florida
American film actresses
German actresses
People from Sarasota, Florida
20th-century American actresses
Actors with dwarfism